Italy have participated 13 times at UEFA Women's Championship.

While the men's senior team have won once the UEFA European Championship, the women's team is yet to win a single edition. Italy have participated in the inaugural European Championship in 1984, where they were eliminated in the semi-finals against Sweden. Italy have failed the qualification once, in 1995.

Italy lost two finals: in 1993 against Norway and in 1997 against Germany. It is the best Italy's record.

UEFA Women's Championship record

UEFA Women's Championship performance

1984 European Competition for Women's Football 

Sweden won 5–3 on aggregate.

1987 European Competition for Women's Football

UEFA Women's Euro 1991

UEFA Women's Euro 1997

UEFA Women's Euro 2001

UEFA Women's Euro 2005

UEFA Women's Euro 2009 

</onlyinclude>

UEFA Women's Euro 2013

UEFA Women's Euro 2017

Notelist

References 

Italy women's national football team
Italy at UEFA Women's Championship
Countries at the UEFA Women's Championship